Bradford Ernest Sullivan (November 18, 1931 – December 31, 2008) was an American character actor on film, stage and television. He was best known for playing the killer Cole in The Sting, hockey goon Mo Wanchuk in Slap Shot, mobster George in The Untouchables (1987) and the gruff Henry Wingo in The Prince of Tides (1991).

Biography

Early life and career
Born in Chicago, Illinois, the son of Winthrop Sullivan and Margaret Schroeder Sullivan, Brad Sullivan served in the Korean War and then attended the University of Maine. After touring with a stage company, he moved to New York City and studied at the American Theatre Wing. He made his Off-Broadway debut in Red Roses for Me in 1961, and went on to appear in the London company of the musical South Pacific.

In the 1960s and early 1970s, he appeared in two productions of the New York Shakespeare Festival — Coriolanus at Central Park's Delacorte Theatre (1965), and Václav Havel's The Memorandum. In 1971, he starred as Rip Cord opposite Adrienne Barbeau as Cookie Kovac in the David Newbburge-Jacques Urbont musical Stag Movie. Theater critic Clive Barnes in The New York Times called the two "quite jolly" and that they "deserve to be congratulated on the lack of embarrassment they show when, on occasion, they have to wander around stark naked. They may not be sexy but they certainly keep cheerful."

In 1972, he made his feature film debut in the military drama Parades (1972; re-released as The Line, 1980). This was followed by an appearance in a CBS TV-movie adaptation of David Rabe's Sticks and Bones, a black comedy about a Vietnam War veteran. The subject matter proved so controversial that half of the network's affiliates refused to broadcast the telefilm.

Success as character actor
Sullivan was then featured prominently in director George Roy Hill's hit The Sting (1973), playing Cole, the hired killer who dogs the Robert Redford and Paul Newman characters. Following roles in other productions, Sullivan reteamed with star Newman and director Hill for Slap Shot (1977), a hit comedy about a down-and-out hockey team. In a departure from the stoic, taciturn parts in which he was often cast, Sullivan played a spectacularly vulgar hockey player, Morris "Mo" Wanchuk.

He followed this with his Broadway debut, playing three different military officers in a revival of David Rabe's play The Basic Training of Pavlo Hummel (April–September 1977), starring Al Pacino. The following year, Sullivan earned a Drama Desk Award nomination for Outstanding Featured Actor in a Musical for his performance as steelworker Mike LeFevre in Working (May–June 1978), adapted from the book by Studs Terkel and also starring Patti LuPone and Joe Mantegna. He would go on to do four other Broadway plays: Beth Henley's The Wake of Jamey Foster (October 1982), with Holly Hunter; a Circle in the Square revival of The Caine Mutiny Court Martial (May–November 1983); Peter Hall's revival of Tennessee Williams's Orpheus Descending (September–December 1989), as Jabe Torrance opposite Vanessa Redgrave's Lady Torrance (both recreating their roles in the TNT cable network's adaptation); and a stage version of the movie On the Waterfront (May 1995).

Sullivan's other feature film credits include Walk Proud (1979), The Island (1980); Ghost Story (1981); Tin Men (1987); The Untouchables (1987); Funny Farm (1988); Dead Bang (1989); The Dream Team (1989); The Abyss (1989); Guilty by Suspicion (1991); True Colors (1991), The Prince of Tides (1991); Sister Act 2: Back in the Habit (1993); The Fantasticks (made 1995, released 2000); The Jerky Boys: The Movie (1995); Canadian Bacon (1995); and Bushwhacked (1995). Of his role as a harsh husband in The Prince of Tides, in which his unwary character is given dog food to eat and consumes it with gusto, Sullivan told an interviewer he was never quite sure if the contents of a can served him by Kate Nelligan, who played his wife, was actually dog food. He added, however, that as an actor he did not believe in questioning a director, and that whatever it was tasted fine.

On television, Sullivan portrayed Artemas Ward in 1984 miniseries George Washington, and Judge Roy Bean in the 1991 television movie The Gambler Returns: The Luck of the Draw. Additional television credits include Miami Vice, The Equalizer, Against the Law, and Best of the West. He had recurring roles on I'll Fly Away, as Mr. Zollicofer Weed, the ex-Marine turned wrestling coach, and NYPD Blue, as Patsy Ferrara, a retired prizefighter who taught Bobby Simone about keeping birds. As a cast member of the drama Nothing Sacred (1997–1998), he played Father Leo, the older priest who helps guide his younger colleagues. His final TV role was on a 2000 episode of Law & Order.

Other theater work includes the Off-Broadway plays The Ballad of Soapy Smith by Michael Weller (1984) and Neal Bell's Cold Sweat (1988) at Playwrights Horizons.

Personal life and death
Sullivan lived on the Upper West Side of Manhattan. He died on December 31, 2008, aged 77, of cancer.

Partial filmography

Parades (1972) - Sergeant Hook
Sticks and Bones (1973)
The Sting (1973) - Cole
Movin' On (1975) - Lt. Hardacre
Slap Shot (1977) - Mo Wanchuk
Walk Proud (1979) - Jerry Kelsey
The Island (1980) - Stark
Ghost Story (1981) - Sheriff Hardesty
Cold River (1982) - Reuban Knat
The Neighborhood (1982, TV movie) - Foreman 
The New Kids (1985) - Colonel Jenkins
Hoosiers (1986) - George
Tin Men (1987) - Masters
The Untouchables (1987) - George
Funny Farm (1988) - Brock
Dead Bang (1989) - Chief Hillard
The Dream Team (1989) - Sgt. Vincente
Signs of Life (1989) - Lobsterman
The Abyss (1989) - Executive Officer Everton
Guilty by Suspicion (1991) - Congressman Velde
True Colors (1991) - FBI Agent Abernathy
The Prince of Tides (1991) - Henry Wingo
Sister Act 2: Back in the Habit (1993) - Father Thomas
The Fantasticks (1995) - Ben Hucklebee
The Jerky Boys: The Movie (1995) - Detective Robert Worzic
Canadian Bacon (1995) - Gus
Bushwhacked (1995) - Jack Erickson

References

External links

Male actors from Chicago
American male film actors
American male television actors
American male stage actors
Deaths from cancer in New York (state)
Place of death missing
Deaths from liver cancer
People from the Upper West Side
1931 births
2008 deaths
University of Maine alumni
20th-century American male actors